Yibo (移拨) or Yiber Kutluk Bilge Koch — was a khagan of Turgesh acknowledged by Xuanzong between 18 August - 15 September 749. In 751, he was allied with the Abbasid Caliphate and Tibet against Tang general Gao Xianzhi and got captured by Chinese forces and taken to court. He was succeeded by Tengri Ermish Qaghan.

References 

8th-century Turkic people
Türgesh khagans
8th-century rulers in Asia